Eulimella scillae is a species of sea snail, a marine gastropod mollusk in the family Pyramidellidae, the pyrams and their allies.

Description
The white shell is rather solid and polished. Its length measures 9 mm. The teleoconch contains 11 to 12 flatly convex whorls. The last whorls are subangulated on the periphery.

Distribution
This species occurs in the following locations: at depths between 99 m and 200 m 
 Azores
 Canary Islands
 Cape Verdes
 European waters (ERMS scope)
 Greek Exclusive Economic Zone
 Madeira
 North Europe
 Portuguese Exclusive Economic Zone
 Spanish Exclusive Economic Zone
 United Kingdom Exclusive Economic Zone
 Mauritania

References

External links
 To Biodiversity Heritage Library (6 publications)
 To CLEMAM
 To Marine Species Identification Portal

scillae
Gastropods described in 1835
Molluscs of the Atlantic Ocean
Molluscs of the Mediterranean Sea
Molluscs of the Azores
Molluscs of the Canary Islands
Molluscs of Madeira
Molluscs of Europe
Gastropods of Cape Verde